Conasprella damasomonteiroi is a species of sea snail, a marine gastropod mollusc in the family Conidae, the cone snails, cone shells or cones.

Description
The height of the shell attains 24 mm.

Distribution
This species occurs in the Atlantic Ocean off Brazil.

References

 Petuch E.J. & Myers R.F. (2014) Additions to the cone shell faunas (Conidae and Conilithidae) of the Cearaian and Bahian subprovinces, Brazilian Molluscan Province. Xenophora Taxonomy 4: 30-43.
  Puillandre N., Duda T.F., Meyer C., Olivera B.M. & Bouchet P. (2015). One, four or 100 genera? A new classification of the cone snails. Journal of Molluscan Studies. 81: 1-23

External links
 To World Register of Marine Species
 Gastropods.com: Jaspidiconus damasomonteiroi

damasomonteiroi
Gastropods described in 2014